Billy Johnson may refer to:
 Billy "White Shoes" Johnson (born 1952), American football player
 Billy Johnson (footballer) (born 1999)), English footballer
 Billy Johnson (baseball) (1918–2006), baseball player
 Billy Johnson (Mormon) (1934–2012), leader and missionary of The Church of Jesus Christ of Latter-day Saints in Ghana
 Billy Johnson (racing driver) (born 1986), NASCAR and sports car racer
 Billy Johnson (rugby league), Australian
 Billy Johnson (drummer)

See also
Billy Johnstone (born 1959), Australian rugby league player
Bill Johnson (disambiguation)
Billy Johnston (disambiguation)
Will Johnson (disambiguation)
William Johnson (disambiguation)
Willie Johnson (disambiguation)